Gamishli may refer to:
 Gamishli Nazar
 Gamishli-ye Khvajeh Nafas
 Gamishli Yelqi